Soblahov (until 1899 ) is a village and municipality in Trenčín District in the Trenčín Region of north-western Slovakia.

History
In historical records the village was first mentioned in 1393 as Sablaho.

Geography
The municipality lies at an altitude of 284 metres and covers an area of 17.832 km². It has a population of about 1957 people.

Friendship commune
Rudniki (  Poland )

References

External links
 
 
http://www.statistics.sk/mosmis/eng/run.html

Villages and municipalities in Trenčín District